So is a tambon (subdistrict) of So Phisai District, in Bueng Kan Province, Thailand. In 2020 it had a total population of 15,880 people.

Administration

Central administration
The tambon is subdivided into 18 administrative villages (muban).

Local administration
The area of the subdistrict is shared by 2 local governments.
the subdistrict municipality (Thesaban Tambon) So Phisai (เทศบาลตำบลโซ่พิสัย)
the subdistrict administrative organization (SAO) So (องค์การบริหารส่วนตำบลโซ่)

References

External links
Thaitambon.com on So

Tambon of Bueng Kan province
Populated places in Bueng Kan province